Dommie Jayawardena, (25 June 1927 – 28 December 1979 as ඩොමී ජයවර්ධන in Sinhala) was a Sri Lankan actor and singer. He achieved fame playing villainous roles including Bollywood film Praan.

Personal life
Dommie Jayawardena was born on 25 June 1927 in Ambalangoda. He died on December 28, 1979, at the age of 52.

Dommie was married to Nona Subeida and the couple has two sons - Roy and Nihal, both were actors. Subeida has acted in two films - Sujatha and Rekava.

Elder son Nihal was born on 4 March 1949. Nihal acted in about 27 films. He died on 25 August 2004. Youngest son Roy was born on 1957 and died on 24 May 2001. He has acted in 16 films.

Cinema career
He first appeared on the silver screen in Sujatha (1953) as the womanizer Wickie. Jayawardena would go on to make over 50 films. Samiya Birinda Deviya featured one of his rare sympathetic performances.

Jayawardena directed two films, Daru Duka and Singapore Charlie.

A Dommie Jayawardena Commemoration Day was held at the John de Silva Memorial Hall Colombo on January 8, 2000.

Filmography

References

External links 
Dommie Jayawardena's Biography in Sinhala Cinema Database

1927 births
1979 deaths
Sri Lankan male film actors
Sinhalese male actors
20th-century Sri Lankan male actors